"But is it Art?" is an episode of the BBC sitcom, The Green Green Grass. It was first screened on 2 November 2007, as the first episode of series three. The title derives from Rudyard Kipling's poem "The Conundrum of the Workshops" (1890), which uses the phrase repetitively.

Synopsis

Boycie and Marlene take a trip to a local country mansion, where Boycie admires the portraits that adorn the walls. Later, in the pub, he recounts his admiration of this long established tradition of respect for the gentry. Meanwhile, thrown out by his wife, Elgin has moved into Bryan's caravan and Mrs Cakeworthy's relentless gossiping fuels speculation about their change in relationship. Later the caravan burns down, and Boycie is horrified to find that Marlene has offered Bryan and Elgin a place to stay until it is fit to inhabit again. Still at the Grange a month later, Boycie despairs of ever getting rid of them, but they have a surprise in store – as a mark of their gratitude, they have commissioned a renowned local artist, Genevieve Klunge, to paint his portrait. Sadly for Boycie, Mrs Klunge is mainly renowned for her paintings of cows.

Episode cast

References

British TV Comedy Guide for The Green Green Grass
BARB viewing figures

2007 British television episodes
The Green Green Grass episodes